Hennadiy Mykolayovych Lahuta (born 10 August 1974) is a Ukrainian politician serving as the governor of Kherson Oblast since 26 October 2021. Lahuta was removed from office by the Russian military on 26 April 2022 during the Russian occupation of Kherson Oblast, but continues to be supported by the government of Ukraine as governor. He was removed from office by Ukrainian government on 9 July, replacing by Dmytro Butriy.

He is a member of the We Have to Live Here party headed by the mayor of Kherson Ihor Kolykhaiev.

Notes

References 

Living people
Ukrainian politicians
Governors of Kherson Oblast
Interregional Academy of Personnel Management alumni
People from Berdiansk
1974 births